The Nursing and Midwifery Council of Nigeria (abbr. NMCN), is the sole governing body that regulates all cadres of nurses and midwives in Nigeria. It was established by government decree in 1979, and re-established as a parastatal by the government of Nigeria by Act Cap. No 143 Laws of the Federation of Nigeria, 2004.

The Council maintains standards of practice, and enforces discipline within the Nigerian nursing profession. It also accredits education in nursing and midwifery, awarding certificates and a diploma in midwifery and nursing after a three years programme. The Council is headed by secretary General/Registrar, who is helped by other professional and non-professional staff. They are responsible to a board reporting to the Federal Ministry of Health.

History
Originally founded in 1949 as the Nursing Council of Nigeria, it operated in parallel with the Midwives Board of Nigeria, until a government decree of 1979 which merged the organizations. The Nursing and Midwifery Council of Nigeria was formally established by decree No. 89, 1979. Adetoun Bailey was the first registrar.

Headquarters and Locations 
The council has its headquarters in Abuja. Other zonal offices are located in Sokoto, Kaduna, Bauchi, Enugu, Port Harcourt, and Lagos.

Notable Nurses and Midwives 

 Adetoun Olabowale Bailey
 Kofoworola Abeni Pratt
 Idowu Philip
 Elfrida O. Adebo
 Veronica Nnaji
Omo-Oba Adenrele Ademola
Grace Ebun Delano

References

External links

Nursing in Nigeria
Organizations established in 1979
1979 establishments in Nigeria
Organizations established in 2004
2004 establishments in Nigeria
Medical and health organizations based in Nigeria
Nursing licensing organizations
State agencies and parastatals of Nigeria